Dorathea Seebeck Davis (October 2, 1951 - December 8, 2005) was a former American Democrat politician who served in the Missouri House of Representatives.

Born in St. Louis, Missouri, she attended De Sales High School and Forest Park Community College.  Her husband Lanny L. Davis died in 2016.

References

1951 births
2005 deaths
20th-century American politicians
21st-century American politicians
20th-century American women politicians
21st-century American women politicians
Democratic Party members of the Missouri House of Representatives
Women state legislators in Missouri